Oligosarcus is a genus of characins from freshwater habitats in northern Argentina, Paraguay, Uruguay, eastern Bolivia, and southern and central Brazil (South, Southeast and Central-West regions).

Species
There are currently 22 recognized species in this genus:

 Oligosarcus acutirostris Menezes, 1987
 Oligosarcus amome Almirón, Casciotta, Piálek, Doubnerová & Říčan, 2015
 Oligosarcus argenteus Günther, 1864
 Oligosarcus bolivianus (Fowler, 1940)
 Oligosarcus brevioris Menezes, 1987
 Oligosarcus hepsetus (G. Cuvier, 1829)
 Oligosarcus itau Mirande, Aguilera & Azpelicueta, 2011
 Oligosarcus jacuiensis Menezes & A. C. Ribeiro, 2010
 Oligosarcus jenynsii (Günther, 1864)
 Oligosarcus longirostris Menezes & Géry, 1983
 Oligosarcus macrolepis (Steindachner, 1877)
 Oligosarcus menezesi Miquelarena & Protogino, 1996
 Oligosarcus oligolepis (Steindachner, 1867)
 Oligosarcus paranensis Menezes & Géry, 1983
 Oligosarcus perdido A. C. Ribeiro, Cavallaro & Froehlich, 2007
 Oligosarcus pintoi Amaral Campos, 1945
 Oligosarcus planaltinae Menezes & Géry, 1983
 Oligosarcus platensis (Messner, 1962)
 Oligosarcus robustus Menezes, 1969
 Oligosarcus schindleri Menezes & Géry, 1983
 Oligosarcus solitarius Menezes, 1987
 Oligosarcus varii Menezes & A. C. Ribeiro, 2015

References

Characidae
Taxa named by Albert Günther
Fish of South America